is a district in Tokyo's Taitō Ward, best known as the home of Ueno Park. Ueno is also home to some of Tokyo's finest cultural sites, including the Tokyo National Museum, the National Museum of Western Art, and the National Museum of Nature and Science, as well as a major public concert hall. Many Buddhist temples are in the area, including the Bentendo temple dedicated to goddess Benzaiten, on an island in Shinobazu Pond. The Kan'ei-ji, a major temple of the Tokugawa shōguns, stood in this area, and its pagoda is now within the grounds of the Ueno Zoo. Nearby is the Ueno Tōshō-gū, a Shinto shrine dedicated to Tokugawa Ieyasu.  Near the Tokyo National Museum there is The International Library of Children's Literature. Just south of the station is the Ameya-yokochō, a street market district that evolved out of an open-air black market that sprung up after World War II.  Just east is the Ueno motorcycle district, with English-speaking staff available in some stores.

Ueno is part of the historical Shitamachi (literally "low city") district of Tokyo, a working class area rather than where the aristocrats and rich merchants lived.  Today the immediate area, due to its close proximity to a major transportation hub, retains high land value but just a short walk away to the east or north reveals some of the less glitzy architecture of Tokyo.

Ueno Station is the nearest train station and is operated by JR East.

Ueno Park and Ueno Station are also home to a large percentage of Tokyo's homeless population.  Though nearly invisible in other parts of Tokyo, the homeless population in Ueno can be found sleeping or communing in large numbers around the "ike" (ponds) of this district.

Economy
Ueno is the hometown of Yoshida Watch Shop, established in 1901 by Shogoro Yoshida. It is the origin of Orient Watch Co., Ltd.

Education

Tokyo University of the Arts

Public high schools are operated by the Tokyo Metropolitan Government Board of Education.

Taito City Board of Education operates public elementary and junior high schools.

Ueno 1-4 and 6-chome and part of Ueno 5-chome are zoned to Kuromon Elementary School (黒門小学校). Ueno 7-chome is zoned to Ueno Elementary School (上野小学校). A portion of Ueno 5-chome is zoned to Heisei Elementary School (平成小学校).

Ueno 1-2 chome is zoned to Ueno Junior High School (上野中学校). Ueno 4 and 7-chome and portions of 3 and 5-6-chome are zoned to Shinobugaoka Junior High School (忍岡中学校). Parts of Ueno 3 and 5-6 chome are zoned to Okachimachi Taito Junior High School (御徒町台東中学校).

Private schools:

Public transport
        Ueno Station
   Okachimachi Station
  Ueno-hirokoji Station
  Ueno-okachimachi Station
  Naka-okachimachi Station
  Yushima Station
  Keisei Ueno Station

See also 
 Ueno Park
Ueno Tōshō-gū

References

External links
  
 Ueno / Official Tokyo Travel Guide GO TOKYO

Districts of Taitō